Ľuboriečka is a village and municipality in the Veľký Krtíš District of the Banská Bystrica Region of southern Slovakia.

External links
 
 
 

Villages and municipalities in Veľký Krtíš District